Eslamabad (also Romanized as Eslāmābād) is a village in Qaflankuh-e Gharbi Rural District of the Central District of Mianeh County, East Azerbaijan province, Iran. At the 2006 National Census, its population was 1,842 in 408 households. The following census in 2011 counted 2,327 people in 632 households. The latest census in 2016 showed a population of 2,281 people in 662 households; it was the largest village in its rural district.

References 

Meyaneh County

Populated places in East Azerbaijan Province

Populated places in Meyaneh County